Second Beach is located at Stanley Park in Vancouver, British Columbia. The beach features a pool, which was first completed in 1932.

References

External links
 

Beaches of Vancouver
Stanley Park
Tourist attractions in Vancouver